Saing may refer to:

 Chay Saing Yun, Cambodian politician
 Sai Htee Saing (1950–2008), Burmese singer-songwriter
 Saing Pen (born 1926), Cambodian equestrian
 Tan Yu Saing, Burmese politician
 Yang Saing Koma, Cambodian academic